Andala Ramudu is a 2006 Indian Telugu-language film directed by P Lakshmi Narayana and produced by NV Prasad and Paras Jain. The film starred Sunil and Aarthi Aggarwal. This movie is the remake of Tamil film Sundara Purushan.

Released on 11 August 2006, The film was a success at the box office.

Plot
Ramudu (Sunil) has tremendous love for his cousin Radha (Aarthi Aggarwal) right from his childhood. Things go wrong for him when his mother dies; his father marries another woman which he dislikes and runs away from home. He returns home (to his grandmother) after twelve years only after his father's death. He even accepts his brother (Venu Madhav) born to his step mom.

Ramudu's love for Radha remains unchanged. In fact, he returns home after so long time only to win Radha's love and marry her.  On the contrary, Radha loves another person, Raghu (Akash) who is an orphan and also jobless. Radha's father (Kota Srinivasa Rao) dislikes this; he lays a condition that he would agree for their marriage only if Raghu finds a job.

Ignorant of the fact, but with good intention, Ramudu offers a job to Raghu. Later, he learns about the fact and gets despaired. In such a circumstance, Ramudu's brother resolves to unite his brother with Radha and eliminate Ramudu's misery.
Ramudu's brother tactfully implicates Raghu in a murder and sends him to prison. Thus he plays a spoil game in averting marriage between Radha and Raghu. In such a distressed condition, Radha's father with no other option remaining pleads with Ramudu to marry Radha. Ramudu readily agrees and marries Radha.

What happens when Radha learns about the fact later? Will she continue her married life with Ramudu or will she go to Raghu or anything strange happens ... The remaining part of the movie is based on these circumstances.

Cast

 Sunil as Ramudu
 Aarthi Aggarwal as Radha
 Akash as Raghu
 Vadivukkarasi as Grand Mother
 Kota Srinivasa Rao as Bhushanam (Radha's father)
 Brahmanandam
 Dharmavarapu Subramanyam
 Venu Madhav as Ramudu's stepbrother
 Kondavalasa
 Chittajalu Lakshmipati
 Ramachandra Rao
 Lakkimsetty
 Master Bharath
 Duvvasi Mohan
 Chalapathi Rao

Soundtrack 

Music is composed by S. A. Rajkumar, and released on Aditya Music label.

Reception 
Idlebrain.com gave three stars out of five. Reviewer praised the Sunil performance as a lead actor but criticized the film for its weak story and slow narration. Full Hyderabad also opined the same. Sify criticized the film for its lack luster screenplay.

See also
 Andala Ramudu, is also an earlier period Telugu film, directed by Bapu.

References

External links

2006 films
2000s Telugu-language films
Telugu remakes of Tamil films
Indian comedy-drama films
Films scored by S. A. Rajkumar
2006 comedy-drama films